Artur Chernov (born 4 June 1988) is a former Russian tennis player.

Chernov has a career high ATP singles ranking of 589 achieved on 20 July 2009. He also has a career high ATP doubles ranking of 869 achieved on 6 August 2007.

Chernov made his ATP main draw debut at the 2006 St. Petersburg Open in the doubles draw partnering Valery Rudnev.

Junior Grand Slam finals

Doubles: 1 (1 runner-up)

References

External links

1988 births
Living people
Russian male tennis players